Thainess or the Thai identity is a conceptual identity regarding the quality of being Thai, i.e. characteristics seen as distinctive to the Thai people, their culture, and those belonging to Thailand as a whole. It forms the central identity upon which discourses on Thai nationalism have been constructed, with main contributors including King Vajiravudh (Rama VI) during his reign from 1910 to 1925 and Luang Wichitwathakan during the early post-absolute monarchy period (after 1932). Though poorly defined, it is often expressed as devotion to the three pillars of "nation, religion, king", a concept first popularized by Vajiravudh. It was used as a tool by both the absolute monarchy and the People's Party governments to build political hegemony over the country through the process of Thaification, as well as in the anti-communist effort during the 1960s–1970s. It has also become a form of promotional representation by which images of the country are presented to international visitors, especially from the late 20th century. The concept has continued to evolve in various directions, and has been increasingly questioned by scholars since the 1990s and into the 21st century.

See also
 Thai cultural mandates

Further reading

Thai nationalism
Thai culture
Historiography of Thailand